Orlando Moisés Galo Calderón, known as Orlando Galo (born 11 August 2000) is a Costa Rican football player. He plays for Herediano.

International career
He made his debut for the Costa Rica national football team on 7 October 2021 in a World Cup qualifier against Honduras.

References

External links
 
 

2000 births
People from Puntarenas
Living people
Costa Rican footballers
Costa Rica under-20 international footballers
Costa Rica international footballers
Association football defenders
L.D. Alajuelense footballers
C.S. Herediano footballers
Liga FPD players